Hallyeo Haesang National Park in South Korea was designated as national park in 1968 in accordance with Natural Park Act. It comprises six districts: Sangju-Geumsan Mt. district, Namhaedaegyo district, Sacheon district, Tongyeong-Hansan district, Geoje-Haegeumgang district and Yeosu-Odongdo district.

Flora and fauna

The national park is known to have 1,142 species of plants including red pine, black pine, common camellia, serrata oak, cork oak as well as rare species such as nadopungnan (Sedirea japonica), daeheongnan (Cymbidium nipponicum) and the Korean winter hazel. It boasts more than 25 mammal species such as Finless porpoise, Eurasian otter, Asian badger, and so on, 115 bird species, 16 reptile species, 1,566 insect species, and 24 freshwater fish species, including the vulnerable bird species Pitta nympha, also known as the fairy pitta.

In February 2015, a North Pacific right whale, one of the rarest and most endangered whales in the world, was entangled in a mussel farm, and possibly fled from it later in nearby (within Namhae County). This was the first record of the species in 41 years in South Korea, since the catch off the east coast, and was possibly the first official record of a live animal in the Sea of Japan (East Sea) in modern times.

References

External links

The park's page on Korea National Park Service's website

National parks of South Korea
Parks in South Gyeongsang Province
Parks in South Jeolla Province
Protected areas established in 1968